is a fictional character in the Japanese manga series JoJo's Bizarre Adventure, written and illustrated by Hirohiko Araki. The main protagonist of the series' sixth story arc, Stone Ocean, Jolyne is falsely accused of murder by Dio's most loyal friend, Enrico Pucci, and sentenced to 15 years in prison. Eventually, from a pendant given to her by her father, Jotaro Kujo, she got her Stand, which allows her the ability to unravel her body into string. Originally having a strained relationship with him due to his long absence from the majority of her life, she vows to stay in prison in order to save her father and recruited a group of Stand users to help her in her quest to save Jotaro and defeat Pucci.

Araki created Jolyne as he felt that it is necessary of the series to have a female protagonist despite the editorial backlash and believes that the change of perspective towards female characters gives him a chance to show that they're able to fight. Jolyne was initially voiced by Miyuki Sawashiro in JoJo's Bizarre Adventure: All-Star Battle and JoJo's Bizarre Adventure: Eyes of Heaven before being cast in the anime adaptation by Fairouz Ai in Japanese onwards and Kira Buckland in English. Reception of Jolyne has been positive, with many critics praising her complex characterization and development from being a flawed person to becoming a strong-willed character.

Creation and development 

Araki discusses that during the creation of Gorgeous Irene, which features a female protagonist, he felt that a female protagonist wouldn't do well with readers and ended up cancelling it. Araki's editor during Stone Oceans publication, Hideto Azuma, suggested that Jolyne should be a man as they could lose the interest of readers. Araki refused, explaining that that reasoning is why Jolyne should be a woman. He believes that the change of perspective as time goes forward allows him to create a female protagonist allowed to fight and be placed in painful situations. He also felt that Jotaro being saved by his daughter shows her internal growth. In creating Jolyne's theme, Yugo Kanno explains that since she is the first female protagonist he composed for, he wanted to harmonize her femininity and powerfulness and finds it challenging.

In JoJo's Bizarre Adventure: All-Star Battle and JoJo's Bizarre Adventure: Eyes of Heaven, Jolyne was voiced by Miyuki Sawashiro. When the anime adaptation of Stone Ocean was announced, she is voiced by Fairouz Ai. Fairouz first encountered the series during her high school years when she encountered the many notable catchphrases on a video-sharing platform. Curious, she ended up mistakenly buying Stone Ocean, believing it was the first part before finding out Phantom Blood existence. She subsequently became a fan of the series and Jolyne Cujoh, referring to the character as her favorite of the series. During her audition, she was nervous and crying, believing she didn't show all of her capabilities. The staff surprised her by letting her come with the staff the only people in the room and reciting the lines where she was told she got the role. She was directed to portray Jolyne the way she would be Jotaro's daughter and finds it difficult that she was too determined that her voice became rigid. She was also conscious of portraying the character's determination of saving Jotaro. Fairouz had been told by the director that Jolyne's voice would have to be stronger after episode 13, causing her to re-read the manga to be prepared. She also wanted to make sure that Jolyne doesn't sound as cool and low-pitch as Jotaro, wanting to make the character distinct vocally. Fairouz initially finds it difficult to scream out Jolyne's "Oras", thus she sought out Daisuke Ono, who gave her multiple advices on how to act it out. She reflected on how she had the lowest roles out of the cast and wants to use Jolyne as an opportunity of her career's growth. Though she felt she couldn't hear it clearly, she had been told by the staff she was getting better at it.

For the English dub of the anime, Kira Buckland portrayed the character. She expressed her disbelief and cried when hearing her voice as Jolyne. She had practiced screaming Jolyne's cries of "Ora", and watched timecodes and cues in the animation to know when to stop. She views Jolyne as "a very strong, well-written, nuanced and interesting character".

Appearances

In Stone Ocean 
Jolyne Cujoh and her boyfriend, Romeo Jisso, run over a bystander and she gets falsely accused of the incident after Romeo convinces her to hide the incident and uses her as bait. On her way to Green Dolphin Street Prison, she got a pendant from her father, Jotaro, and pricks herself with it., gaining her Stand she later names Stone Free She is visited by her father, who later reveals the incident is a devise to frame her from one of Dio's followers and attempts to help her to escape. However, a Stand known as Whitesnake steals Jotaro's memories and Stand as DISCs, making him comatose. Realizing the extent of how much her father loved her and his desire to keep her safe, she vows to stay in order to save his life and find the person who is Whitesnake's user. She is then joined by fellow Stand users Emporio Alniño, Ermes Costello, Foo Fighters, Weather Report, and Narciso Anasui.

Tagging along with Weather Report, she goes on a mission to retrieve Star Platinum's disc and gives it to the Speedwagon Foundation's messenger pigeon for his recovery, succeeding after tricking Whitesnake. Jolyne gets herself send to the Ultra Security House Unit to find Dio's bone, forced to fight against a couple of Stand users. She and Narciso found the Green Baby, formed after Dio's plan in the diary has enacted and chased it to make sure it wouldn't meet Enrico Pucci. Finally encountering Pucci, she fought him and forced to make a choice to continue fighting him or retrieving Jotaro's memory DISC. She chooses the latter, enabling Pucci to fuse with the Green Baby. After Pucci's escape, Jolyne and Emporio fight against Miu Miu and along with Ermes, escape the prison. With Foo Fighters and Weather Report dead during the journey and Jotaro Kujo joining the team, they unsuccessfully fight Pucci in Cape Carneval, who finally evolves his Stand to Made in Heaven. He uses his new power accelerate time around the world in order to create a new universe in his and Dio's image.  With Pucci killing everyone except Jolyne and Emporio, she knows that Pucci could sense her thanks to him having the Joestar birthmark, she sacrifices herself for Emporio's life.

As Emporio finally kills Pucci after the latter stops completely resetting the universe to kill Emporio, a new universe is created where Pucci doesn't exist. Emporio meets the new versions of his friends, including Jolyne, now named , who is considering getting engaged to Anasui's counterpart, Annakiss, and asks her universe's version of Jotaro for his approval.

In other media 
Jolyne appears as a playable character for JoJo's Bizarre Adventure: All Star Battle, its remake JoJo's Bizarre Adventure: All Star Battle R, JoJo's Bizarre Adventure: Eyes of Heaven and JoJo's Bizarre Adventure: Last Survivor. Jolyne is one of the playable characters of Monster Strike with a limited starter pack with her and Jotaro as one character from July 15 to August 2, 2022 and Puzzle & Dragons in collaborations of the anime and the game's 10th anniversaries from December 26, 2022 to January 9, 2023.

Reception 
Jolyne's complexity and character development has been praised by critics. Caitlin Moore of Anime News Network enjoys the appearance of a female JoJo and praises Jolyne's multiple states of emotions without coming across as contradictory and how she and Erina Pendleton show similar development as they are forced to toughen up in their given situations. The reviewer states that every time Jolyne's leitmotif kicks in, it "creates a beautiful sense of recognition, both for her impending victory and a sense that she truly is a continuation of the Joestar line we've been following for generations." In Moore's review on Anime Feminist, she sees Jolyne as relatable, due to showing a lot of vulnerability and having potential for growth, but believes that due to Jolyne being the series' first female protagonist, her lack of control of her power during the first episode isn't a great look. She states Jolyne's scene of being caught masturbated as being liberating as she only feels ashamed of being caught in the act and being assertive of her own sexuality.

Jose Arroyo of The Review Geek appreciates her similarities with Joseph Joestar and Jotaro Kujo in personality and abandoning her childlike characteristics during her confrontation with Jotaro. Sebastian Stoddard of Anime News Network believes Jolyne to be a well-written protagonist due to being written like a shounen protagonist and that Araki's choice of writing her that way makes her just as dynamic as the male shounen protagonists. Alastair Johns of Comic Book Resources sees Jolyne's impression of being a hot-blooded teenager to be a subversion thanks to becoming a cautious and exploitative person. Francesco Cacciatore of Screen Rant highlights that her flaws make her the best protagonist of the series, noting how her introduction of hiding Romeo's involvement and framing her makes her still guilty, compared to how the previous Joestars would have responded to the situation. The reviewer sees her journey as her redemption and how she evolves into a person worthy of bearing the Joestar bloodline. He concluded that they are what makes her more human-like compared to the rest of the protagonists of the series while still having the Joestar spirit. Cold Cobra of Anime UK News notes how Jolyne is introduced as a meek person before gradually becoming more confident and used to her harsh situation, making her a fun character to cheer for. Luke Maguire of FictionTalk sees her as a strong female lead not because of her strength, but because of how her character is developed and finds how she uses her Stand ability creatively as brilliant.

Britanny Vincent of IGN comments that Stone Free is an intriguing change from the stands of the previous Joestars due to her ability to turn into string serves for intriguing combat and creative uses and how it only makes Jolyne an empowering female character.

The focus between the daughter and father relationship between Jolyne and Jotaro Kujo has been thoroughly discussed. Toussaint Egan of Polygon notes how Jotaro and Jolyne are not that different from each other in their respective parts and how his cold personality and parental abandonment made her resent him. The reviewer highlights how in comparison to other parts, Jotaro and Jolyne have to work together and bring up the pain Jotaro had bought into her and sees her desire to save him as a dramatic turning point, as despite how badly damaged their relationship is, both of them clearly loved each other and has a chance to mend it. Jose Arroyo of The Review Geek in the review of the first batch dislikes how quickly how quickly their relationship has resolved as he believes there are barely any emotional moments between the two that is deserving of Jolyne's forgiveness and it ends up being rushed and unearned. Thus, in his review of the second batch, he praises the handling her newfound appreciation towards Jotaro better as it includes a heartfelt moment between the two. Jose Arroyo's review during the third batch expresses happiness of Jotaro and Jolyne's reunion and Jotaro witnessing her maturity and showcasing his pride. Kambole Campbell of Thrillist notes how Jotaro's personality in what makes him cool in Stardust Crusaders is instead deconstructed with Jolyne seeing him as an uncaring father and that is what makes it intriguing and similar to the other relationships throughout the Joestar family. Suzail Ahmad of Game Rant believes that Jotaro's sacrifice leads her to make better decisions, giving her the chance to save him.

In a survey held in the 30th anniversary exhibition, Hirohiko Araki JoJo Exhibition: Ripples of Adventure, Jolyne's hairstyle is ranked as the one voters want to try most.

Notes

References 

Comics characters introduced in 2000
Female characters in anime and manga
Fictional characters with evocation or summoning abilities
Fictional Japanese American people
Fictional murdered people
Fictional prison escapees
Fictional prisoners and detainees
JoJo's Bizarre Adventure